Novy Aul (Yeni Aul) is a rural locality (a selo) and the administrative centre of Novoaulsky Selsoviet, Magaramkentsky District, Republic of Dagestan, Russia. The population was 2,760 as of 2010. There are 28 streets.

Geography 
Novy Aul is located 14 km northeast of Magaramkent (the district's administrative centre) by road. Zakhit and But-Kazmalyar are the nearest rural localities.

Nationalities 
Lezgins, Azerbaijanis and Rutuls live there.

References 

Rural localities in Magaramkentsky District